Kondiaronk (c. 1649–1701) (Gaspar Soiaga, Souojas, Sastaretsi), known as Le Rat (The Rat), was Chief of the Native American Wendat people at Michilimackinac in New France. As a result of an Iroquois attack and dispersal of the Hurons in 1649, the latter settled in Michilimackinac. The Michilimackinac area refers to the strait between Lakes Huron and Michigan (or, the area between Michigan's Upper and Lower Peninsulas) in the present day United States.

Noted as a brilliant orator and a formidable strategist, Kondiaronk led the pro-French Petun and Huron refugees of Michilimackinac against their traditional Iroquois enemies. Kondiaronk realized the only way to establish security was to maintain a war between their enemies, the Iroquois, and the French in an attempt to keep the Iroquois occupied and the Hurons safe from annihilation. Kondiaronk succeeded in killing the peace; however, once he had secured the preservation of his people he favored a vast peace settlement. This effort concluded in what is known as The Great Peace of Montreal (1701) between France, the Iroquois, and the other Indian tribes of the Upper Great Lakes. This ended the Beaver Wars and helped open up the interior of North America to deeper French exploration and commerce. Kondiaronk made them see the advantages such a peace would bring them.

The Jesuit historian Father Pierre François Xavier de Charlevoix wrote that "it was the general opinion that no Indian had ever possessed greater merit, a finer mind, more valor, prudence or discernment in understanding those with whom he had to deal". Louis-Hector de Callière, the Onontio (governor) that replaced Frontenac, was "exclusively indebted to him for ... this assemblage, till then unexampled of so many nations for a general peace". Kondiaronk contracted a fever and died in Montreal during the negotiations for the Great Peace on August 2, 1701. His body was buried at Montreal's Notre-Dame Church after a majestic funeral. Today, no trace of the grave remains. The Kondiaronk Belvedere in Montreal's Mount Royal Park is named in his honor. In 2001, he was named a Person of National Historic Significance by the Canadian government.

Early diplomatic efforts

Kondiaronk's first major role came in 1682, representing the Mackinac Huron tribe in negotiations between the French governor Frontenac and the Ottawa tribe which shared Michilimackinac village. Kondiaronk looked towards the French for protection from the Iroquois tribes after an Iroquois chief, a Seneca, was murdered while being held prisoner in the Michilimackinac village. 
Afterwards, the Huron sent wampum belts to the Iroquois to appease the murder; however, the diplomatic representative of the Ottawa told Frontenac that the Huron did not send any of the Ottawa's wampum belts. Furthermore, the Ottawa insisted that the Huron placed all the blame for the murder on them. Kondiaronk maintained his position that the actions of the Huron were only to placate the Iroquois, but the Ottawa were not convinced and French efforts to conciliate the two tribes had little effect. Despite the tensions between the Huron and Ottawa, Kondiaronk's appeal to the French did secure an alliance to stave off Iroquois military advances.

1688 coup

By 1687, the French Governor General, Denonville, had taken over the land of the Senecas. Kondiaronk and the Hurons agreed to ally with the French as long as Denonville promised that war against the Iroquois would not stop until the Iroquois were fully defeated.

In 1688, Kondiaronk formed a war party and traveled to Fort Frontenac on the way to raid Iroquois villages. While at the fort, Kondiaronk learned that Denonville had begun discussing peace with the Iroquois, despite his prior agreement with the Hurons that war would continue. The war party withdrew back across Lake Ontario and waited for the Iroquois Onondaga delegation to pass through on their way to Montreal.
When the Iroquois diplomats arrived, Kondiaronk and his war party took them by surprise with a forest ambush. One chief was killed and the remaining Iroquois taken captive. When the prisoners explained to Kondiaronk that they were a peaceful delegation and not a war party, Kondiaronk pretended to be astonished, then angry, with Denonville's betrayal. 
He told the Iroquois captives,

"Go, my brothers, I release you and send you back to your people, despite the fact we are at war with you. It is the governor of the French who has made me commit this act, which is so treacherous that I shall never forgive myself for it if your Five Nations do not take their righteous vengeance."

Kondiaronk's war party returned to their village at Michilimackinac with an Iroquois captive given as a replacement for a Huron killed in the skirmish. When the prisoner was presented to the French commandant at Michilimackinac, the Frenchman ordered him killed. The commandant was not aware that his government was trying to negotiate peace with the Five Nations—he was keeping in line with the current Huron declaration of war.

An old Seneca slave was summoned to witness the execution of his countryman, and afterwards Kondiaronk ordered the man to travel to the Iroquois and report how badly the French had treated the captive. Since the captive was intended for adoption into the Michilimackinac village, the way his death was portrayed to the Iroquois angered them because they felt the French disrespected their tradition. Due to Kondiaronk's skillful manipulation of events, the peace negotiations between the French and Iroquois came to a halt—a satisfactory result for the Hurons.

Warfare and later diplomatic efforts 1689–1701

Starting in 1689 a decade of warfare ensued known as Frontenac's War (1689–1697) that involved a series of conflicts between the French and the English. As a result of Kondiaronk's skillful manipulation, Frontenac's War included conflicts between the French and the Iroquois. However, the years 1697 -1701 marked the beginning of a period of intense diplomatic activity that would lead to the Great Peace of Montreal four years later.

Kondiaronk was held responsible for provoking the Iroquois to a point where it was impossible to appease them, as exemplified by the sacking of Lachine during the summer of 1689. The Iroquois, in retaliation to the French, burned, killed, and sacked plantations which left the Island of Montreal in a state of utmost dismay. However, Kondiaronk continued to prevent a separate French-Iroquois peace by any means possible despite the aggressiveness of the warrior nation, the Iroquois.

In 1689, Kondiaronk was caught plotting with the Iroquois for the destruction of their Ottawa neighbors.

As the Hurons were split in a pro-French faction led by Kondiaronk and a pro-Iroquois faction, in 1697 Kondiaronk warned the Miamis of an imminent attack led by Lahontan and his Iroquois allies. Kondiaronk led 150 warriors into a two-hour canoe engagement on Lake Erie and defeated a party of 60 Iroquois. This restored Kondiaronk's pre-eminence and the Hurons' place as Frontenac's children.

With conflict in Europe ending with the Treaty of Ryswick in 1697, New York and New France agreed to suspend hostilities. New York encouraged the Iroquois to make peace with New France. Since the Iroquois could no longer use English military threat to their advantage against New France in September 1700 they signed a treaty to make peace with Frontenac independent of New York, which led to the first step of negotiations. Kondiaronk returned to Michilimackinac and urged all the nations of the Lakes to go there the following August essentially acting as an architect of the peace of 1701.

Settlement of 1701  final Indian congress

The final Indian congress began 21 July 1701. The central goal was to negotiate a treaty of peace among the natives and with the French. One main conflict standing in the way of peace was the debates over the return of prisoners who had been captured during previous wars or other campaigns and enslaved or adopted. For Governor Hector de Callière, the conference was the result of 20 years of diplomacy.

Bacqueville de la Potherie (Le Roy), the primary source of information on these deliberations, went to Sault-Saint-Louis (Caughnawaga) to meet many of the parties at the village of the Mission Indians. The first flotilla that arrived carried nearly two hundred Iroquois, headed by the ambassadors of the Onondagas, Oneidas, and Cayugas. The Senecas had dropped by the way, and the Mohawks would follow later. The men approached, firing their guns. The salute was returned by the mission Indians, who were their close brethren, and they ranged along the shore. At the water's edge, they were greeted by a small-fire and then retired to the main council lodge where they smoked together for some time in a mood of tranquility. That evening, the "three rare words" of the ritual of requickening were presented to them – these three concepts included the wiping of tears, clearing of the ears, and opening of the throat. The significance of this was to prepare them to begin the conference and deliberation the next day with Onontio.

The next morning the Iroquois "shot the rapids to the main fire at Montreal, where they were greeted by the crash of artillery". They had scarcely disappeared when several hundred canoes carrying French allies appeared. This included Chippewas, Ottawas, Potawatomis, Hurons, Miamis, Winnebagos, Menominees, Sauks, Foxes, and Mascoutens. In total, over 700 Indians would be received to great ceremonies at the landing. The Calumet Dance was a specialty of the Far Indians, and it was done to the accompaniment of gourd rattles. The dance was greatly significant to making friends of their hosts and instilling a feeling of cooperation and alliance. By 25 July, negotiations between the tribes and the French were fully under way. Kondiaronk spoke of the difficulties and struggles encountered in the process of recovering Iroquois prisoners from the allies. He was suspicious of whether the Iroquois would comply in an exchange with sincerity or cheat them of their "nephews", that had been taken over the past 13 years of war. He was concerned that the allies would be deceived, and yet, they were so determined to make peace that they were willing to leave their prisoners to display their good faith. The next day proved telling, however, as the Rat's suspicions were confirmed and the Iroquois admitted that they did not have the prisoners that they had promised to return. They defended themselves by saying that, as small children, the prisoners had been given to families for adoption. They were, the Iroquois said, not the masters of their young people. This explanation irritated the Hurons and Miamis, as they had, in their efforts, forced their Iroquois captives away from foster families to be returned. The following days were full of deep discussion and argument. Kondiaronk, having persuaded his own and allied tribes to bring their Iroquois prisoners to Montreal, was angry and embarrassed about his failed efforts at an exchange. He returned to his hut that night and prepared to speak severely in the next day's conference about the importance of cooperation and compromise.

Illness, death and legacy: 1701–1760

Amidst the deliberations that last day of July, Kondiaronk became ill, unable to stand at the conference on 1 August. He was seated in a comfortable armchair, and after having an herbal drink made of maidenhair fern syrup, he was strong enough to speak. He spent the next two hours condemning the Iroquois for their misbehavior, and additionally, recounting his role in averting conflict with the Iroquois, his success in recovering prisoners, and his role in peaceful negotiations. "We could not help but be touched", wrote La Potherie, "by the eloquence with which he expressed himself, and could not fail to recognize at the same time that he was a man of worth." He retired to his hut after speaking, too exhausted to remain at the conference. He died at 2 a.m. the next day, at the age of 52. It was because of Kondiaronk's inspirational speeches that the remaining parties were convinced to sign the peace treaty, the Great Peace.

When his death was announced, many Iroquois, who were well known for their death and burial ceremonies, participated in covering the body of Kondiaronk in a ritual called "covering the dead". Sixty men marched in a procession led by Louis-Thomas Chabert de Joncaire, with the Seneca chief Tonatakout, carrying the rear. The procession sat in a circle around the body, and a man appointed as the chanter paced and sang for a quarter of an hour. After him, a second speaker, Aouenano, wiped away the tears of the mourners, opening their throats, and pouring in a sweet re-quickening medicine. Then, after producing a belt, he restored the Sun and urged the warriors to emerge from darkness to the light of peace. Afterwards, he covered the body, which would be permanently covered later during a Christian burial ceremony at Notre-Dame Church in Montreal. The Jesuits claim to have converted him on his deathbed, despite Kandiaronk's lifelong rejection of Christianity. Contemporary scholars, however, generally reject this version of events as a political ploy by the Jesuit missionaries.

His funeral was elaborate, and both natives and French took part. French representatives were paired with delegations of a segment of Huron-Petun society. Marching in front of the coffin were a French officer, sixty soldiers, sixteen Huron warriors, and French clergymen. The coffin was carried by six war leaders, and was covered with flowers. There rested upon the top of the coffin a gorget, a sword, and a plumed hat. Behind the coffin, Kondiaronk's relatives followed, along with the Ottawa and Huron-Petun chiefs. The wife of the intendant, Mme. De Champigny, the governor of Montreal, M. de Vaudreuil, and the entire officer corps were at the rear of the procession. The war leaders, at the grave, fired a salute. The inscription on his resting place read: Cy git le Rat, Chef des Hurons ("Here lies the Muskrat, Chief of the Hurons"). Today, there is no remaining trace of this burial place, though it is thought that he lies somewhere near the Place d'Armes.

The French idealized the deceased chief, using him to demonstrate what all chiefs should aspire to be like. They compared him to French leaders and institutions, which painted a picture of idealized chiefs who would direct consensual politics, and rule with non-coercive authority. The French envisioned these chiefs as the governors of small principalities, and emissaries of the French government. This comparison and French ideology would remain a source of tension between the natives and France until French Canada's fall in the mid-eighteenth century. In fact, Pennahouel, an Ottawa chief who consulted with General Montcalm in July 1757, was compared to Kondiaronk, and "celebrated for his spirit, his wisdom" and his easy conversation with Frenchmen. Kondiaronk was preserved in literature, as Adario in the Baron de Lahontan's New Voyages to North America (1703). As a result of this, he became the model for all the "noble natives" who were thereafter recorded in European literature.

Oratory

In The Dawn of Everything: A New History of Humanity, anthropologist David Graeber and archaeologist David Wengrow analyze the work of French explorer and philosopher the Baron Louis-Armand Lahontan (1666-1716) whose journals were published, as New Voyages to North America, in Amsterdam in the early 18th century. Graeber and Wengrow describe Lahontan's interviews with Kondiaronk, who is given the fictitious name Adario.

In many native American societies, hierarchies were eschewed and persuasion was employed to decide public policy. Rational oratory was a highly valued skill and Kondiaronk's were reputed to be second to none. His skills won him tours of the salons of Paris and regular engagements as a supper debater with the Governor of Montreal, Hector de Callière. One of these debates, in 1699, witnessed by Lahontan, is retold by Graeber and Wengrow:

Graeber and Wengrow observe of this conversation that what the Europeans seem to have sacrificed for the sake of their social structure was the ability to conceive that their culture could be different by design. Kondiaronk was willing to consider that Americans could be assimilated into European culture, as indeed they were, but Callière was unwilling to even imagine the possibility of such far-reaching and profound changes in the opposite direction.

Graeber and Wengrow make a lengthy case in their book that dismissing attestations of indigenous people's philosophical statements as fabrications created by Europeans is a form of anti-indigenous bigotry. However, the authenticity of this speech was contested by historian David A. Bell on the grounds that "anyone familiar with European fiction knows, there was no conceit more common for European authors of this period than presenting a fictional work as a first-hand account of real events."

References 

Wyandot people
Native American leaders
17th-century Native Americans
1640s births
1701 deaths
Persons of National Historic Significance (Canada)